Ostrinia peregrinalis is a species of moth in the family Crambidae. It is found in Estonia and Russia.

References

Moths described in 1852
Pyraustinae
Moths of Europe